The 2002–03 UC Irvine Anteaters men's basketball team represented the University of California, Irvine during the 2002–03 NCAA Division I men's basketball season. The Anteaters were led by 6th year head coach Pat Douglass and played at the Bren Events Center. They were members of the Big West Conference.

Previous season 
The 2001–02 UC Irvine Anteaters men's basketball team finished the season with a record of 21–11 and 13–5 in Big West play.

Roster

Schedule

|-
!colspan=9 style=|Non-Conference Season

|-
!colspan=9 style=|Conference Season

|-
!colspan=9 style=| Big West Conference tournament

Source

Awards and honors
Adam Parada 
All-Big West Second Team
Jeff Gloger 
Big West All Freshman Team

References

UC Irvine Anteaters men's basketball seasons
UC Irvine
UC Irvine Anteaters
UC Irvine Anteaters